Seventh Mission is the Japanese debut album by the South Korean boy band Boyfriend. It was released on May 29, 2013, in four different editions.

Background
The title of the album “SEVENTH MISSION” represents the six members and the seventh is their fans coming together for one mission, the album.
The album, which will include eleven songs, will release in four different versions: Limited Type A, Limited Type B, CD Only, and The Lawson and HMV Versions. Limited Type A is said to include an extra DVD with footage from the guys’ "Nippon Budokan Premium Showcase Live" and a member character charm; Limited Type B will include a 30-minute DVD; the Lawson and HMV versions will have additional content; and the CD Only will include a bonus track.

Composition
The album is composed by eleven songs, 4 singles, 7 new songs and short edit of Korean version Melody of Eyes. The track Melody of Eyes was originally recorded in Japanese and released on their latest Japanese single Melody of Eyes

Singles
Three songs from the album were released as singles:

The first single from the album is original Japanese song, "Be My Shine". It was released on August 22, 2012 as the group's Japanese debut single. It peaked number 4 on Oricon's Weekly chart with around 56,000 copies sold to date.

The second single from the album is another original Japanese song "Dance Dance Dance / MY LADY", with two sided disc songs, Dance Dance Dance and MY LADY. It was released on November 28, 2012. It peaked number 3 in Oricon's Weekly chart with around 37,800 copies sold to date.

The third and final single from the album is original Japanese single "Melody of Eyes".  It was released on March 27, 2013. It peaked number 4 in Oricon's Weekly chart with around 34,010 copies sold to date.

Track listing

Charts

Oricon

References

2013 debut albums
Boyfriend (band) albums